Meenar-1 Dam is a concrete gravity dam constructed across Meenar river in Seethathodu Village of Pathanamthitta district in Kerala,  India. Its a diversion dam built as a part of Sabarigiri HEP.  

Sabarigiri Hydro Electric Project ( 340 MW) is the second largest hydro electric project of Kerala and is located in Pathanamthitta district. This dam was constructed as a part of Sabaigiri Augmentation Scheme. The reservoir receives water from Kullar- Gavi reservoir and its own catchment. Water from this reservoir is diverted to Meenar – II reservoir through a tunnel. Taluks through which release flows to Pamba river and it flows 
through Ranni, Konni, Kozhencherry, Thiruvalla, Chengannur, Kuttanadu, Mavelikara and Karthikappally.

Specifications 

 Latitude : 9⁰ 24′ 59 ” N
 Longitude: 77⁰ 10′ 34” E
 Type of Dam : Concrete – Gravity
 Panchayath : Seethathodu
 Village : Seethathodu
 District : Pathanamthitta
 River Basin : Pamba
 River : Meenar
 Release from Dam to river: Pamba
 Year of completion : 1991
 Name of the project : Sabarigiri HEP
 Classification : MH ( Medium Height)
 Maximum Water Level (MWL) : EL 1077.2 m
 Full Reservoir Level ( FRL)EL 1076.0 m
 Storage at FRL : 0.03 Mm3
 Height from deepest foundation : 17.20 m

 Length : 36.75 m
 Spillway: Ungated- overflow section
 Crest LevelEL : 1076.0 m
 River Outlet : Pamba

References 

Dams in Kerala